Jethro Mitchell  was an American politician who served as a member of the  Massachusetts House of Representatives, the Massachusetts Senate, and in the Massachusetts Constitutional Convention of 1820.

Political offices
Mitchell was a member of the Massachusetts Constitutional Convention of 1820, a member of the  Massachusetts House of Representatives in 1821, and a member of the Massachusetts Senate in 1823 .

References

Members of the Massachusetts House of Representatives
Massachusetts state senators
People from Nantucket, Massachusetts